C'mon Take on Me is the ninth studio album by Swedish hard rock band Hardcore Superstar, released on 27 February 2013. The album was announced on 30 October 2012. The debut single "One More Minute" was officially released on 30 November 2012. The second single, "Above The Law", was officially released on 22 January 2013.

Track listing

Personnel
Jocke Berg - vocals
Vic Zino - guitar
Martin Sandvik - bass, vocals
Magnus "Adde" Andreason - drums

References

Hardcore Superstar albums
2013 albums
Sony Music albums
Nuclear Blast albums